The African Rhythmic Gymnastics Championships is a continental sports rhythmic gymnastics competition held every two years and organized by African Gymnastics Association.

Summary of championships

See also
African Artistic Gymnastics Championships

References

Rhythmic gymnastics competitions
African championships
Recurring sporting events established in 2000
 
Gymnastics in Africa